George Mullen is an astronomer who co-authored several peer-reviewed articles with Carl Sagan. He, along with Carl Sagan, pointed out the Faint young Sun paradox. In addition to studying the early Earth atmosphere, he studied the atmosphere of Jupiter.

References 

Living people
Year of birth missing (living people)
Place of birth missing (living people)
Astrobiologists
Astrochemists